Gorodishchensky District is an administrative and municipal district (raion), one of the twenty-seven in Penza Oblast, Russia. It is located in the east of the oblast. Its administrative center is the town of Gorodishche. Population: 52,480 (2010 Census);  The population of Gorodishche accounts for 15.4% of the district's total population.

References

Notes

Sources

 
Districts of Penza Oblast